was the 39th emperor of Japan, according to the traditional order of succession.

Kōbun's reign lasted only a few months in 672.

Traditional narrative
Emperor Kōbun was named the 39th emperor by the Meiji government in 1870; and since the late 19th century, he is known by the posthumous name accorded to him by Meiji scholars.

In his lifetime, he was known as Prince Ōtomo (大友皇子, Ōtomo no ōji).  He was the favorite son of Emperor Tenji; and he was also the first to have been accorded the title of Daijō-daijin.

Contemporary historians now place the reign of Emperor Kōbun between the reigns of Emperor Tenji and Emperor Tenmu; but the Nihongi, the Gukanshō, and the Jinnō Shōtōki do not recognize this reign.  Prince Ōtomo was only given his posthumous title and name in 1870.

Post-Meiji chronology
 In the 10th year of Tenji, in the 11th month (671): Emperor Tenji, in the 10th year of his reign (天智天皇十年), designated his son as his heir; and modern scholars construe this as meaning that the son would have received the succession (senso) after his father's death.  Shortly thereafter, Emperor Kōbun is said to have acceded to the throne (sokui).  If this understanding were valid, then it would follow:
 In the 1st year of Kōbun (672): Emperor Kōbun, in the 1st year of his reign (弘文天皇元年), died; and his uncle Ōaomino ōji received the succession (senso) after the death of his nephew.  Shortly thereafter, Emperor Tenmu could be said to have acceded to the throne (sokui).

Pre-Meiji chronology
Prior to the 19th century, Ōtomo was understood to have been a mere interloper, a pretender, an anomaly; and therefore, if that commonly accepted understanding were to have been valid, then it would have followed:
 In the 10th year of Tenji, in the 11th month (671): Emperor Tenji, in the 10th year of his reign (天智天皇十年), died; and despite any military confrontations which ensued, the brother of the dead sovereign would have received the succession (senso);  and after a time, it would have been understood that Emperor Tenmu rightfully acceded to the throne (sokui).
Control of the throne was wrested by Emperor Tenchi's brother, Prince Ōama, during the Jinshin War, after which Emperor Kōbun committed suicide. For centuries, the hapless Prince Ōtomo was not considered to have been a part of the traditional order of succession.

The actual site of Kōbun's grave is known.  This emperor is traditionally venerated at a memorial Shinto shrine (misasagi) at Shiga.

The Imperial Household Agency designates this location as Kōbun's mausoleum.  It is formally named Nagara no Yamasaki no misasagi.

Non-nengō period
The years of Kōbun's reign are not linked by scholars to any era or nengō.  The Taika era innovation of naming time periods – nengō – languished until Mommu reasserted an imperial right by proclaiming the commencement of Taihō in 701. 
 See Japanese era name – "Non-nengo periods"
 See Kōbun (period) (672).

In this context, Brown and Ishida's translation of Gukanshō offers an explanation about the years of Empress Jitō's reign which muddies a sense of easy clarity in the pre-Taiho time-frame: 
"The eras that fell in this reign were: (1) the remaining seven years of Shuchō [(686+7=692?)]; and (2) Taika, which was four years long [695–698]. (The first year of this era was kinoto-hitsuji [695].) ... In the third year of the Taka era [697], Empress Jitō yielded the throne to the Crown Prince."

Kugyo
The top  during Emperor Kōbun's reign included:
 Sadaijin, Soga no Akae (蘇我赤兄) (?–?), 672 (7 months)
 Udaijin, Nakatomi no Kane (中臣金) (d. 672), 672 (7 months)

Consorts and children
Consort: Princess Tōchi (十市皇女), Emperor Tenmu's daughter
 First son: Prince Kadono (葛野王, 669–706)

Consort: Fujiwara no Mimimotoji (藤原耳面刀自), Fujiwara no Kamatari's daughter
 Princess Ichishi-hime (壱志姫王)

Emperor Kōbun had another son named Prince Yota (興多王), whose mother is unknown.

Ancestry

See also
 Emperor of Japan
 List of Emperors of Japan
 Imperial cult

Notes

References
 Aston, William George. (1896).  Nihongi: Chronicles of Japan from the Earliest Times to A.D. 697. London: Kegan Paul, Trench, Trubner.  
 Brown, Delmer M. and Ichirō Ishida, eds. (1979).  Gukanshō: The Future and the Past. Berkeley: University of California Press. ;  
 Ponsonby-Fane, Richard Arthur Brabazon. (1959).  The Imperial House of Japan. Kyoto: Ponsonby Memorial Society. 
 Titsingh, Isaac. (1834). Nihon Ōdai Ichiran; ou,  Annales des empereurs du Japon.  Paris: Royal Asiatic Society, Oriental Translation Fund of Great Britain and Ireland.  
 Varley, H. Paul. (1980). Jinnō Shōtōki: A Chronicle of Gods and Sovereigns. New York: Columbia University Press. ;  

 
 

Japanese emperors
648 births
672 deaths
People of Asuka-period Japan
7th-century monarchs in Asia
7th-century Japanese monarchs
Deified Japanese people
Sons of emperors
Suicides in Japan
Heads of state who committed suicide
Japanese politicians who committed suicide
Dethroned monarchs